Stephen Saviano (born August 31, 1981) is a former American-Italian professional ice hockey left winger. He last played for the Lausitzer Füchse in  DEL2.

Saviano spent four seasons with the University of New Hampshire and turned pro in 2004. He had spells in the American Hockey League with the Lowell Lock Monsters and the ECHL with the Florida Everblades. In 2006 he moved to Sweden to play in HockeyAllsvenskan the country's second tier, playing for the Växjö Lakers. In 2007, he signed with Finnish SM-liiga side Tappara, but after two seasons in the Finnish SM-liiga, he returned to Växjö Lakers.

After six seasons in Sweden between the Lakers and Djurgårdens IF in the Swedish Hockey League, Saviano left as a free agent and signed a one-year contract with Italian participants of the Austrian EBEL, HCB South Tyrol on August 25, 2015. In his only season with Bolzano in the 2015–16 campaign, Saviano contributed with 11 goals and 30 points in 54 games.

As a free agent, Saviano opted to leave Italy to sign with Northern Irish EIHL participants, the Belfast Giants, on a one-year contract on June 7, 2016. He stayed for two seasons and was an assistant captain with the team during the 2017-18 season. On August 20, 2018, Saviano signed with the Lausitzer Füchse in DEL2, playing one season there before retiring in 2019.

Awards and honors

Career statistics

References

External links

1981 births
Living people
American men's ice hockey right wingers
American people of Italian descent
Bolzano HC players
Belfast Giants players
Djurgårdens IF Hockey players
Florida Everblades players
Ice hockey players from Massachusetts
Lowell Lock Monsters players
New Hampshire Wildcats men's ice hockey players
Tappara players
Växjö Lakers players
AHCA Division I men's ice hockey All-Americans
American expatriate ice hockey players in Northern Ireland
American expatriate ice hockey players in Sweden
American expatriate ice hockey players in Germany
American expatriate ice hockey players in Italy